Kal Geh-ye Sardasht (also known as Kal Gah and Kal Geh) is a village in Sardasht Rural District, in the Central District of Lordegan County, Chaharmahal and Bakhtiari Province, Iran. At the 2006 census, its population was 453, in 87 families.

References 

Populated places in Lordegan County